Agni IPS is a 1997 Indian Kannada-language action film directed by Anand P. Raju, written by R. Selvaraj and produced by Rockline Venkatesh. The film stars Saikumar and Ranjitha, with B. Saroja Devi playing a supporting role. The film has musical score by Ram Chakravarthy, and the cinematography was by J. G. Krishna.

Plot
Agni is an honest and short-tempered cop, who clashes with Kotwal, a dangerous gangster. While clearing a riot created by Kotwal on the streets, Agni loses his friend Baasha Khan. Agni marries Ranjitha after being stalked and troubled by her. The three students Raghupathi, Raghava, and Rajaram, who are responsible for ruining the college, are arrested by Agni.

Kotwal and a corrupt politician create a lot of troubles in which Baasha Khan's mother gets killed, and Ranjitha suffers a miscarriage, which leads to divorcing Agni by blaming him for the mess. In the end, Ranjitha and the lawyer gets kidnapped, where Agni saves them and kills Kotwal.

Cast 
 Saikumar as Agni IPS
 Ranjitha as Sneha 
 B. Saroja Devi 
 Umashri as Baasha Khan's mother
 Satya Prakash as Kotwal
 Sudheer
 Mandeep Roy
 Shakti Prasad
 Lakshman Rao 
 Param Gubbi 
 Rockline Venkatesh as Baasha Khan
 Vasudev Rao
 B. Jayamma 
 Rathnakar

Soundtrack 
The music was composed by Ram Chakravarthy, with lyrics by S. Keshavamurthy.

References

External links 
 

1997 films
1990s Kannada-language films
Indian action films
Fictional portrayals of the Karnataka Police
1990s masala films
Indian police films
1997 action films
1990s police films